Eastern Orthodoxy in Saudi Arabia is a Christian minority consisting of people of various nationalities that are adherents of the Eastern Orthodox Church. 

The percentage of Saudi Arabian citizens who are Christians is officially zero. 
The Saudi Arabian Mutaween, or Committee for the Promotion of Virtue and the Prevention of Vice (i.e., the religious police) prohibits the practice of any religion other than Islam. The Greek Orthodox have some numerical strength. Major nationalities in Saudi Arabia include Egyptians, Syrians, Palestinians and Lebanese.

References

See also
 Christianity in Saudi Arabia
 Protestantism in Saudi Arabia
 Roman Catholicism in Saudi Arabia
 Human rights in Saudi Arabia
 Freedom of religion in Saudi Arabia
 Christianity in the Middle East
 Christianity in Eastern Arabia
 Arab Christians

Christianity in Saudi Arabia
Saudi Arabia
Saudi Arabia